C. spinosus  may refer to:
 Ceanothus spinosus, the greenbark ceanothus or redheart, a plant species native to southern California and northern Baja California
 Chalepoxenus spinosus, an ant species endemic to Kazakhstan
 Chelidonichthys spinosus, the red gurnard, a fish species

See also
 Spinosus